Emile's Boat is a 1962 French-Italian drama film directed by Denys de La Patellière and starring Annie Girardot, Lino Ventura and Michel Simon. It is based on the eponymous 1954 novel by Georges Simenon.

It was made at the Epinay Studios in Paris while location shooting took place in La Rochelle. The film's sets were designed by the art director Maurice Colasson.

Cast 
 Annie Girardot as Fernande
 Lino Ventura as Émile Bouet
 Michel Simon as Charles-Edmond Larmentiel
 Pierre Brasseur as François Larmentiel
 Jacques Monod as Maître Lamazure
 Édith Scob as Claude Larmentiel
 Roger Dutoit as Patron du bistrot
 Joëlle Bernard as La patronne de La Marine
 Roger Pelletier as Simon Mougin
 Etienne Bierry as Marcelin
 André Certes as Lucien Beauvoisin
 Jean Solar as Albert Vicart
 Pierre Vielhescaze as Le marchand de radio
 Guy Humbert as L'agent
 Marcel Bernier as Plevedic
 Yves Gabrielli as L'employé d'Air France
 Derville as Léon
 Jean-Louis Tristan as 	Le valet

References

External links 

1962 drama films
1962 films
Films based on works by Georges Simenon
Films based on Belgian novels
French drama films
Italian drama films
Films set in La Rochelle
Films shot at Epinay Studios
1960s French-language films
Films directed by Denys de La Patellière
Films with screenplays by Michel Audiard
1960s Italian films
1960s French films